Uyandykovo (Uyandıq) is a rural locality (a village) in Novomedvedevsky Selsoviet, Ilishevsky District, Bashkortostan, Russia. The population was 182 as of 2010. There are 3 streets.

Geography 
Uyandykovo is located 31 km north of Verkhneyarkeyevo (the district's administrative centre) by road. Andreyevka is the nearest rural locality.

References 

Rural localities in Ilishevsky District